August Mühlberg (1888 Kabala Parish (now Türi Parish), Kreis Fellin – ?) was an Estonian politician. He was a member of II Riigikogu. He was a member of the Riigikogu since 9 April 1924. He replaced Oskar Sepre. On 17 May 1924, he was removed from his position and he was replaced by Johannes Sillenberg.

References

1888 births
Year of death missing
People from Türi Parish
People from Kreis Fellin
Workers' United Front politicians
Members of the Riigikogu, 1923–1926